The 2002 House elections in Georgia occurred on November 5, 2002 to elect the members of the State of Georgia's delegation to the United States House of Representatives. Georgia has thirteen seats in the House, apportioned according to the 2000 United States Census.

These elections were held concurrently with the United States Senate elections of 2002 (including one in Georgia), the United States House elections in other states, and various state and local elections.

Georgia gained two House seats after the 2000 Census, but the Democratic-controlled Georgia General Assembly wanted to see more Democrats in the congressional delegation. They produced a map that was designed to elect seven Democrats and six Republicans; the delegation at the time consisted of eight Republicans and three Democrats. Notable differences between the new Congressional districts that were drawn as compared with the previous ones that previously existed were: the Third district, the predecessor of modern Eighth district, was reconfigured to be more neutral than its previous incarnation; the districts of Incumbent Representatives John Linder (R) and Bob Barr (R) were combined into one district (this being the modern Seventh district); and the creation of the Twelfth and Thirteenth districts (each of which were designed to favor Democrats).

Overview

District 1

Following redistricting as a result of the 2000 Census, this district, based in southeastern Georgia, maintained its strongly conservative bent, pulling from the conservative suburbs of Savannah, the social conservatives along the coastline, and stretching into the highly conservative Warner Robins, where an air force base is located. Incumbent Republican Congressman Jack Kingston ran for a sixth term in Congress, and he won it by crushing Democratic nominee Don Smart in a landslide.

District 2

Incumbent Democratic Congressman Sanford Bishop has represented this relatively liberal, southwestern Georgia district since his initial election in 1992. Pulling from Valdosta, Albany, Americus and some of Columbus, this district has a considerable African-American population, which contributed to the district's liberal bent and to Congressman Bishop's continual elections. Bishop won his sixth term in Congress without any opposition.

District 3

When incumbent Republican Congressman Saxby Chambliss declined to seek another term in Congress to instead pursue a successful campaign for the Senate, an open seat was created. Democrat Jim Marshall, Chambliss's 2000 opponent and a former Mayor of Macon, emerged as the Democratic nominee and narrowly edged out Republican businessman Calder Clay to win his first term.

District 4

While incumbent Democratic Congresswoman Cynthia McKinney opted to run for a sixth term in Congress, she was defeated in the Democratic primary by DeKalb County State Court Judge Denise Majette. In this solidly liberal district based in Atlanta and the African-American-heavy suburbs in DeKalb County, the Democratic primary was tantamount to election. True to the district's leanings, Majette crushed Republican nominee Cynthia Van Auken in the general election.

District 5

Civil Rights Movement leader John Lewis has represented this staunchly liberal district since 1987. Congressman Lewis has not faced any remotely serious challenge in his career, seeing as the 5th district is rooted in the city of Atlanta. This year proved to be no different, and Lewis won a ninth term in Congress with no opposition.

District 6

Incumbent Republican Congressman Johnny Isakson, elected in a 1999 special election to replace the former Speaker of the House Newt Gingrich, sought his third term in this highly conservative district based in the northern suburbs of Atlanta. Congressman Isakson defeated Democratic nominee Jeff Weisberger in the general election.

District 7

Incumbent Republican Congressman John Linder and Bob Barr were redistricted into the same district, a heavily-gerrymandered conservative district based in the northern suburbs of Atlanta. The district was numerically Barr's (the 7th), but was geographically more Linder's district. Linder easily defeated Barr in the Republican primary. Linder has been an outspoken conservative during his time in Congress and was well known for being the main congressional sponsor of the FairTax. In 2002, Congressman Linder faced Democratic candidate Mike Berlon in the general election and defeated him in a landslide.

District 8

Five-term incumbent Republican Congressman Mac Collins ran for a sixth term in this gerrymandered, conservative district based in some of the southern and western suburbs of Atlanta and the rural communities of north-central Georgia. Congressman Collins faced computer consultant and Democratic nominee Angelos Petrakopoulos in the general election, which he won handily.

District 9

In this heavily conservative district based in northeastern Georgia, the eastern exurbs of Atlanta and the northern suburbs Augusta, incumbent Republican Congressman Charlie Norwood sought a fifth term. Norwood was the heavy favorite in this district, one of the most conservative in the country, and easily trumped Democratic opponent Barry Irwin in the general election.

District 10

Incumbent Republican Congressman Nathan Deal was initially elected to Congress in 1992 as a Democrat, but switched to his current affiliation as a Republican in 1995 and has been re-elected without substantive opposition ever since. Deal represents a heavily conservative district that includes much of northwestern Georgia, the northern and eastern suburbs of Atlanta and the city of Gainesville. Congressman Deal was unopposed in the general election and thus won his sixth term without competition.

District 11

This gerrymandered district that runs along much of Georgia's northern border with Alabama and includes liberal-leaning rural territory north of Atlanta overlaps with much of the former 7th district, represented by four term Republican incumbent Bob Barr. Barr opted to run for re-election in the new 7th district which contained a significant portion of his old base. Republican State Senator Phil Gingrey emerged victorious in the Republican Primary for this open seat election. Gingrey faced Democratic candidate Roger Kahn, a businessman, Barr's 2000 opponent, and a member of the Georgia State Elections Board. In a close election, Gingrey defeated Kahn and won his first term in Congress.

District 12

This district, created as a result of Georgia's population growth, was drawn by the Democrats in the Georgia State Legislature to elect a Democrat; given the newly-drawn district's high African-American population and the fact that it would have voted for Al Gore in the 2000 presidential election, this was a realistic expectation. Max Burns, a professor at Georgia Southern University and a former Screven County Commissioner, emerged as the Republican nominee while Augusta businessman Charles "Champ" Walker, Jr., the son of powerful State Senator Charles Walker, became the Democratic nominee. This solidly Democratic district pulled from Savannah, Augusta, and Athens and was expected to elect Walker. However, when ethical problems emerged for Walker, he began losing ground and eventually lost to Burns by a solid margin.

District 13

Created as a result of Georgia's population growth, this heavily-gerrymandered district surrounded Atlanta and pulled from heavily Democratic communities in the surrounding counties. State Senator David Scott became the Democratic nominee and faced off against Republican Clay Cox, whom he defeated by a fairly solid margin in the general election.

References

2002 Georgia (U.S. state) elections
Georgia
2002